The Masked Singer Australia is an Australian reality television singing competition show hosted that premiered on Network 10 on 23 September 2019. Hosted by Osher Günsberg, the show is based on the international music game show franchise Masked Singer which originated from the South Korean television program King of Mask Singer. The show is filmed at Disney Studios Australia. A fourth season premiered in August 2022.

Production
In March 2019, TV Blackbox shared leaked news that Network 10 would be producing a local series of the franchise. The news was officially announced in May 2019 at the network's upfronts. In June 2019, it was revealed that Osher Gunsberg would be the host of the series. On 15 July 2019, it was revealed that American actress Lindsay Lohan would join the show as a panellist. Australian singer Dannii Minogue, comedian Dave Hughes and radio presenter Jackie O were also announced alongside Lohan.

At the network's upfronts in October 2019, it was announced that the series had been renewed for a second season. In April 2020, it was reported that the coronavirus pandemic would force pre-production of the second season to be delayed so filming was postponed from late July to early August 2020. Lindsay Lohan was also unable to fly to Melbourne to take part in the program and was replaced by new panellist, comedian Urzila Carlson.

In October 2020, it was announced that the series had been renewed for a third season, which premiered on 13 September 2021.

On 20 October 2021, it was announced that the series will return with a new season set to air in 2022, with Jackie O, Minogue, and Carlson all not returning. Mel B, Abbie Chatfield, and Chrissie Swan joined the panel as their replacements.

In February 2023, Swan announced that the show would be returning for a fifth season, set to air later in 2023.

Security

The show has an 'extreme security protocol' in effect both during and after filming to protect the celebrity's identities from leaking, with host Günsberg stating that the show "was beyond any kind of security I've been exposed to." Everyone involved in the show signed a non-disclosure agreement which prevented anyone from revealing any information about the shooting dates, costumes or identities of the masks episode until its broadcast. The celebrities who appear on the show are only allowed to inform their spouse about their participation, who must also sign one.

In order to keep the identities of the masks secret, audience members and the majority of the production staff were not allowed to watch the unmasking and were removed from the studio moments before the celebrities are revealed, with Günsberg revealing that there were "only 8 people in the room when it [the unmasking] happened."

Audience members had to place their phones in a special magnetic locked pouch when they were on set and were frequently swept throughout filming by security, which included former ASIO officials, for any devices and hidden cameras to ensure the masks' identities were kept secret.

Design

Costumes
The costumes are designed and created by Australian Academy Award and BAFTA Award-Winning costume designer Tim Chappel, best known for his work on The Adventures of Priscilla, Queen of the Desert with Lizzy Gardiner.

Cast

Panellists and host

Following the announcement of the series, it was confirmed by Network 10 that the judging panel would consist of international actress and singer Lindsay Lohan, radio personality Jackie O, singer-songwriter Dannii Minogue and comedian Dave Hughes. It was also confirmed that Osher Günsberg would host the show.

On 7 July 2020, it was revealed that Lohan would be unable to return to the judging panel in the second season, as she could not travel from Dubai to Melbourne because of the COVID-19 pandemic and the implementation of travel restrictions. She was replaced for season two by new panellist, comedian Urzila Carlson.

On 4 May 2022, it was announced on The Kyle and Jackie O Show that Carlson would be leaving the show to focus on her comedy tour, with the possibility of Lohan returning after a two-season absence. On 21 May, Minogue announced her departure from the show after three seasons, due to clashing commitments filming a new gay-dating show in the UK, I Kissed a Boy. On 4 June, Jackie O announced she would also depart from the show. On 9 June, Channel 10 announced that the three new panellists joining Dave Hughes for the fourth season would be television and radio presenter Chrissie Swan, television personality and radio host Abbie Chatfield and international singer Mel B.

Season overview

Awards and nominations

|-
! scope="row"| 2019
| AACTA Awards
| Best Entertainment Program
| The Masked Singer
| 
|

Controversy
In October 2019, American band Halocene claimed that the program had stolen "note for note, beat for beat" their arrangement of "Bad Guy" by Billie Eilish, which the Lion (Kate Ceberano) sang during the third episode. The rock trio had released the cover on their YouTube channel, which also included original melodies from an unreleased original song. The band threatened legal action and set up a GoFundMe page, receiving support from their fans.

See also

Australian Idol
Australia's Got Talent
It Takes Two
List of Australian television series
The Masked Singer

References

External links
 
 

Network 10 original programming
2019 Australian television series debuts
2010s music television series
2010s Australian game shows
2020s music television series
2020s Australian game shows
Australian music television series
2010s Australian reality television series
Music competitions in Australia
English-language television shows
Australian television series based on South Korean television series
Australian television series based on American television series
Television shows set in Sydney
Television series by Warner Bros. Television Studios
 
2020s Australian reality television series